Państwowe Muzeum Archeologiczne w Warszawie is a museum located in the old Warsaw Arsenal in Warsaw, Poland. The museum was established in 1923 and has been in its current location since 1958.

Activities of the museum 

The National Museum of Archaeological organizes excavations in different parts of Poland, develops and publishes the results of research including those from other museums and institutions related to archeology.

It promotes archeology and prehistory, both on their own premises, as well as other museums, including foreign ones. The museum provides lessons, film screenings, and demonstrations. Since 1995, the museum along with the University of Warsaw organizes an archaeological festival.

The museum has recently (as at 2014) been heavily modernised and includes detailed displays in both Polish and English.

External links
 
 

Museums in Warsaw
Museums established in 1923
Archaeological museums in Poland
1923 establishments in Poland
Registered museums in Poland